Elizabeth Williamson is an American journalist. She is a feature writer at The New York Times and a reporter for The Wall Street Journal.

Life 
She was born in Chicago. She graduated from Marquette University. 

Her work appeared in The Atlantic. Rolling Stone, and Slate.

Works 

 Sandy Hook: An American Tragedy and the Battle for Truth, Dutton, 2022.

References

External links 

 Elizabeth Williamson, "Sandy Hook - An American Tragedy and the Battle for Truth"  C-SPAN, March 11, 2022

American journalists
Year of birth missing (living people)
Living people